The North East Liberties of Coleraine (named after Coleraine town) is a barony in County Londonderry, Northern Ireland. It borders the north-Londonderry coastline, and is bordered by three other baronies: Coleraine to the west; Dunluce Lower to the north-east; Dunluce Upper to the south-east. The North East Liberties of Coleraine formed the north-western part of the medieval territory known as the Route. 

The area was part of County Antrim from 1584 to 1613, when it became part of the new County Londonderry.

History

List of major settlements
Coleraine (east of the River Bann)
Portstewart

List of civil parishes
Below is a list of civil parishes in the North East Liberties of Coleraine:
Ballyaghran
Ballymoney (also partly in baronies of Dunluce Upper and Kilconway in County Antrim)
Ballywillan (split with barony of Dunluce Lower)
Ballyrashane (also partly in barony of Dunluce Lower)
Coleraine
Kildollagh

References